Northia pristis is a species of sea snail within the family Nassariidae.

Habitat
It lives in benthic environments, scavenging on molluscs, polychaetes, and dead organic material.

Distribution
Its distribution covers the Pacific Ocean near countries spanning from the United States to Ecuador.

References

External links
 Deshayes, G. P., & Milne-Edwards, H. (1844). Histoire naturelle des animaux sans vertèbres, présentant les caractères généraux et particuliers de ces animaux, leur distribution, leurs classes, leurs familles, leurs genres, et la citation des principales espèces qui s’y rapportent, par J. B. P. A. de Lamarck. Deuxième édition, Tome dixième. Histoire des Mollusques. J. B. Baillière: Paris. 638 pp.

Gastropods described in 1844
Nassariidae
Molluscs of the Pacific Ocean
Molluscs of the United States
Molluscs of Mexico
Molluscs of Central America
Fauna of Colombia
Fauna of Ecuador